Vallarino is a surname. Notable people with the surname include:

Nicolás Ardito Barletta Vallarino (born 1938), Panamanian politician and President of Panama
Adrian Vallarino (born 1968), Uruguayan film producer, director and journalist
Alberto Vallarino Clement (born 1951), Panamanian businessman and politician
Arturo Vallarino (born 1943), Panamanian politician
Carlo Vallarino Gancia, Brazilian businessman